The Pakistan cricket team toured England from 29 July to 22 September 2010. The tour consisted of four Tests, two Twenty20s (T20) and five One Day Internationals (ODIs). The first Test of the series, at Trent Bridge, was the 900th Test match to be played by England.

Test series

First Test

Second Test

Third Test

Fourth Test

After being put into bat by Pakistan, England were reduced to 102 for 7 on the second day. Jonathan Trott and Stuart Broad then put on a world record score for the eighth wicket with a partnership of 332.

Betting allegations

On the third day of the 4th Test, British newspaper News of the World published a story with allegations that an agent loosely affiliated with some of the Pakistani players (later identified as Mazhar Majeed) had accepted a £150,000 (US$232,665) bribe from undercover reporters for information that two Pakistani bowlers (Mohammad Asif and Mohammad Amir) would deliberately deliver no-balls at specific points during the match, information which could be used by gamblers to make wagers with inside information (a process known as spot-fixing, compared with match fixing to predetermine a match result).

In the video posted by News of the World, Majeed, counting out the bribe money, predicted that Amir would be Pakistan's bowler for the third over, and that the first ball of that over would be a no-ball delivery. Amir did bowl the third over, and on his first delivery from the over, bowled a no-ball delivery. Commentary described the delivery as a "massive overstep", a good half-metre beyond the popping crease following the television replay of the delivery. Majeed also predicted that the sixth delivery of the tenth over would be a no-ball, and the ball, delivered by Asif, was also a no-ball delivery.

As a result of the allegations and video posted by News of the World, Scotland Yard announced during the evening that they had arrested Majeed on charges of suspicion of conspiracy to defraud bookmakers. Two days later, after the Test match had completed, three more arrests were made (two unidentified men and an unidentified woman) on money laundering charges in connection with the allegations. Police also seized the cell phones of Asif, Amir, and Salman Butt as part of their investigations.

Yawar Saeed, the Pakistan team manager insisted after the conclusion of the test series that the T20 series and the ODI series will be played. He also refused to say that Butt should resign as Test captain.

On 1 November 2011, Asif, Amir and Butt were found guilty for their part in the spot-fixing and were given prison sentences, ranging from six months to 30 months.

Twenty20 series
Following the betting allegations, Mohammad Asif, Mohammad Amir and Salman Butt were eventually dropped from the Twenty20 and One day squad's at the players request. They had not been suspended, and three players would be called up to replace them. This followed several days where the PCB refused to drop or suspend the players from the rest of the tour, even after England requested that the trio sit out the rest of the tour.

On 2 September 2010, after the warm-up List A game between Pakistan and Somerset, the International Cricket Council announced that they had suspended Asif, Amir and Butt under the provision of the ICC's Anti-Corruption Code. The statement from the ICC stated that the three players were charged "under various offenses under Article 2 of the ICC Anti-Corruption Code for Players and Player Support Personnel relating to alleged irregular behavior during, and in relation to, the fourth Test between England and Pakistan at Lord's last month".

1st T20I

2nd T20I

ODI series

1st ODI

2nd ODI

3rd ODI

4th ODI

5th ODI

Tour matches

First-class: Worcestershire vs Pakistan

List A: Somerset vs Pakistan

References

Eng
2010
Cricket controversies
Sports betting scandals
2010 in English cricket
International cricket competitions in 2010